Sirio Vernati (12 May 1907 – 22 February 1993) was a Swiss footballer who played for Switzerland in the 1938 FIFA World Cup. He also played for FC Zürich, Grasshopper Club Zürich, FC Luzern, and Young Fellows Zürich.

References

External links
FIFA profile

1907 births
1993 deaths
Footballers from Zürich
Swiss men's footballers
Switzerland international footballers
1938 FIFA World Cup players
Association football midfielders
FC Zürich players
Grasshopper Club Zürich players
FC Luzern players